Satyadev Pachauri is an Indian politician and the former Minister of Khadi, Village Industries, Sericulture, Textile, Micro, Small & Medium Enterprises and Export Promotion in the Government of Uttar Pradesh. He is the current Member of Parliament from Kanpur parliamentary constituency of Uttar Pradesh.

Early life
Pachauri was born on 12 August 1948 in a traditional Brahmin family of Pandit Pyarelal Pachauri at village Mihona dist. Bhind (M.P). He completed M.Sc. in Chemistry from VSSD College during that time he was elected as The Student President. He started his political career in 1967 with Akhil Bharatiya Vidyarthi Parishad. In 1991 he was elected to Uttar Pradesh Legislative Assembly first time from Arya Nagar constituency of Kanpur Nagar district.

Controversy 
He was involved in a controversy for publicly ridiculing a female disabled employee when noted disability activist Satendra Singh (doctor) filed the first ever case under the new Rights of Persons with Disabilities Act, 2016.

References 

1947 births
Living people
Uttar Pradesh MLAs 2012–2017
Uttar Pradesh MLAs 2017–2022
Bharatiya Janata Party politicians from Uttar Pradesh
State cabinet ministers of Uttar Pradesh
Yogi ministry
India MPs 2019–present